Ann Marie Furedi (born 31 October 1960) is the former chief executive of the British Pregnancy Advisory Service, the UK's largest independent abortion provider.

Furedi has worked in pro-choice organisations for more than 20 years, mainly in policy and communications. She ran the press office of the UK Family Planning Association before leading Birth Control Trust, a charity that advocated the need for research and development in methods of contraception and abortion. Before joining BPAS, as its chief executive in June 2003, Furedi was Director of Policy and Communications for the UK regulator of infertility treatment and embryo research, the Human Fertilisation and Embryology Authority (HFEA). She is regarded as a leading pro-choice advocate and spokesperson, often appearing in the media representing this perspective.

Prior to her career in pro-choice organisations, Furedi was a journalist, specialising in healthcare features for women's magazines, including Cosmopolitan and Company, sometimes writing under her maiden name, Bradley. She is also known as Ann Burton. In the early 1980s, she worked for the National Council for Civil Liberties as its Gay Rights Officer.

In 1982, she married Frank Furedi, the founder and then leader of the British Revolutionary Communist Party (RCP).

Ann Furedi was a contributor to the party's LM Magazine until it folded in 2000 after being found to have libelled ITN journalists. She has also contributed to Spiked Online, an online magazine, that identifies itself as libertarian humanist.  For that magazine, she has written in support of sex-selective abortion.

Furedi is the vice-chairman of the Governing Body at MidKent College.

References

External links
BPAS official site

1961 births
British abortion-rights activists
Living people